Ota Filip (9 March 1930 – 2 March 2018) was a Czech novelist and journalist. He wrote in both German and Czech.

Life
Filip was born in Slezská Ostrava, in present-day Czech Republic. His novels have been translated into French, Italian, Spanish and Polish. During the communist era government of Czechoslovakia his works were banned or censored by the authorities, and after the occupation of Czechoslovakia by Warsaw Pact Armed Forces in 1968, he was sentenced for his dissident activities, and incarcerated from 1969–71. In 1974, he was forced to emigrate to what was then West Germany.

Since 1975, he was a member of the Bavarian Academy of Arts and Sciences, Munich, Germany.

Filip was awarded a number of literary awards in the Czech Republic and Germany, including the Adelbert von Chamisso Prize for German writing by a non-native German speaker.

On 28 October 2012, Ota Filip was awarded the National Medal of Merit in Fine Arts, a merit awarded to distinguished Czech artists by the Czech government on the occasion of the anniversary of the founding of the First Czechoslovak Republic in 1918.

Selected works
 Cesta ke hřbitovu, Profil, Ostrava, 1968
 Blázen ve městě, Konfrontace, Curych, 1975; Profil, Ostrava, 1991
 Nanebevstoupení Lojzka Lapáčka ze Slezské Ostravy, Edice Petlice, sv. č. 28, Prague, 1974; Český spisovatel, Prague, 1994
 Poskvrněné početí, 68 Publishers, Toronto, 1976; Západočeské nakladatelství, 1990
 Valdštýn a Lukrecie, 68 Publishers, Toronto, 1979
 Děda a dělo, Host, Brno, 1989
 Die Sehnsucht nach Procida, Fischer Verlag, Frankfurt am Main, 1988
 Kavárna Slavia, Český spisovatel, Prague, 1993
 Sedmý životopis, Host, Brno, 2000
 Sousedé a ti ostatní, Host, Brno, 2003
 77 obrazů z ruského domu - Román o velké, ztroskotané lásce a vzniku abstraktního umění, Barrister & Principal, Brno, 2004
 Osmý čili nedokončený životopis, Host, Brno, 2007

References

Bibliography
 Jan Kubica, Spisovatel Ota Filip, Větrné mlýny (Prague) 2012, 
 Verspätete Abrechnungen von Ota Filip, mit einem Beitrag von Walter Schmitz sowie einer Bibliografie. Dresden: Thelem, 2012.  (veröffentlichte 9. Dresdner Chamisso-Poetikvorlesungen)
 
 Kliems, Alfrun: Im Stummland: Zum Exilwerk von Libuse Moníková, Jirí Grusa und Ota Filip, Frankfurt am Main: Lang, 2003
 Massum Faryar,  Fenster zur Zeitgeschichte: Eine monographische Studie zu Ota Filip und seinem Werk, Berlin: Mensch-und-Buch-Verl., 2005
 Kritisches Lexikon zur deutschsprachigen Gegenwartsliteratur. Hrsg. v. Heinz Ludwig Arnold. München: edition text + kritik
 Jiří Hanuš, Malý slovník osobností českého katolicismu 20. století s antologií textů,  Centrum pro studium demokracie a kultury, Brno 2005.  .
 Josef Tomeš a kol.,  Český biografický slovník XX. století I. A-J.  Paseka, Prague ; Litomyšl 1999.

External links
 Homepage
 Slovnik ceske literatury
 Medailon na Portálu české literatury
 Ota Filip a poznámky k jeho takzvaným ostravským románům 

1930 births
2018 deaths
Writers from Ostrava
Czech people of Polish descent
20th-century German novelists
21st-century German novelists
Czech novelists
Czech journalists
German journalists
Czech male writers
German male novelists
20th-century German male writers
21st-century German male writers
German male non-fiction writers
Czechoslovak emigrants to Germany
German people of Czech descent
German people of Polish descent